"Am I Wrong" is a 2013 song by Nico & Vinz.

Am I Wrong may also refer to:

Music
 "Am I Wrong" (Étienne de Crécy song) (2000)
 "Am I Wrong", a 1988 song by Witness
 "Am I Wrong", a 1994 song by Keb' Mo' from Keb' Mo'
 "Am I Wrong", a 1994 song by Love Spit Love from Love Spit Love
 Am I Wrong?, a 1998 album by Gitane DeMone
 "Am I Wrong", a 2003 song by Mull Historical Society from Us
 "Am I Wrong", a 2015 song by Anderson Paak from Malibu
 "Am I Wrong", a 2016 song by BTS from Wings

Other uses
 Am I Wrong, a sister website of Am I Right

See also
"Am I Very Wrong?", a song by Genesis from the 1969 album From Genesis to Revelation